Futbolo klubas Garliava, commonly known as Garliava, is a Lithuanian football club located in Garliava. They currently play in the 1 Lyga - second tier of Lithuanian football.

History
The club was founded at the beginning of 2008. Club started for 25 children training. In the 2017 season they made their debut in the LFF Cup tournament.

2021 season
In 2021 the club immediately licensed to the First League. They were replaced to the Second League. In the first stage of tournament was in group of the winners. In the second round competed for the top positions. They finished fourth in the final lineup. This place allowed the team to play in the promotional playoffs and compete for the place in 2022 in the II Lyga. The first match against Sūduva B was won 9–0. The second match ended 1–0. The aggregate score of the two matches was 10–0, so the club won the right to play in 2022 in the II Lyga.

Honours

Domestic
  II Lyga
 4th place: 2021

Recent seasons

Kit evolution 
 2021 – Joma (kit manufacturer)

Colors 
 2008 – now.

Stadium
Club play their home matches in Stadium of the school of Adomas Mitkus (Adomo Mickaus mokyklos stadionas). The current capacity of the stadium is 500 seats.

Current squad

Notable and famous players
FK Garliava players who have either appeared for their respective national team at any time or received an individual award while at the club.
Lithuania

References

External links
 Official site
 Facebook: FK Garliava
 lietuvosfutbolas.lt
 Soccerway
 SofaScore
 globalsportsarchive

Football clubs in Lithuania
Association football clubs established in 2008